Platygyriella aurea is a species of moss belonging to the genus Platygyriella. It is found in Asia and only occurs in Nepal, India, and Laos.

References

Hypnaceae

Plants described in 1984
Flora of India (region)
Flora of Nepal
Flora of Laos